Ziarul de Gardă is an independent weekly newspaper in the Republic of Moldova, founded by Alina Mazureac and Aneta Grosu on 29 July 2004, as a press edition dedicated to investigative journalism, which publishes articles exposing acts of corruption and human rights violations. The newsroom produces a weekly print edition in Romanian, another print edition in Russian, web pages in both languages, radio and television shows such as TV Reporter de Gardă, and social media content.

The Romanian-language edition appears weekly every Thursday and has 24 pages in colour and black and white. Circulation in 2018 was more than 330,000 copies, or about 6,000 per week. The Russian-language print edition, launched in 2015, appears weekly every Friday, with a 12-page color and black-and-white volume. It had a circulation of over 70,000 copies in 2018 (approximately 1,300 per week).

References

External links
 Ziarul de Gardă

Newspapers published in Moldova